Chistyakov (Чистяков) is a Russian surname. Notable people with the surname include:

Father George Chistyakov, Russian orthodox priest and historian
Ivan Chistyakov (1900–1979), Soviet general
Pavel Chistyakov, Russian painter and art teacher

Russian-language surnames